Felix Krabbe (born 5 January 1978) is a German former yacht racer who competed in the 2004 Summer Olympics.

References

1978 births
Living people
German male sailors (sport)
Olympic sailors of Germany
Sailors at the 2004 Summer Olympics – 470
Place of birth missing (living people)